Chhapra is a city and headquarters of the Saran district in the Indian state of Bihar. It is situated near the junction of the Ghaghara River and the Ganges River.

Chhapra grew in importance as a river-based market in the 18th century when the Dutch, French, Portuguese, and English established saltpeter refineries in the area. It was recognized as a municipality in 1864. The major railway station is Chhapra junction. There is a well known shakti peeth temple in Chhapra named Ambika Bhavani.

Geography

India's biggest double-decker flyover is being constructed in Chhapra. This 3.5 km long double-decker flyover from Bhikhari Chowk to Bus Stand, is being constructed at the cost of  411.31 crore from the central road fund (CRF) under engineering procurement construction (EPC) mode by Bihar Rajya Pul Nirman Nigam Limited (BRPNNL). It is longer than 1.8 km double-decker flyover in Santa Cruz–Chembur Link Road. Chief Minister Nitish Kumar laid the foundation stone of this double-decker flyover in July 2018, which is set to be completed by June 2022.

Climate

Demographics
As per 2022 census, Chapra Urban Agglomeration had a population of 1123456. Chapra Urban Agglomeration includes Chapra (Nagar Panchayat) and Sandha (Census Town). Chapra Nagar Panchayat had a total population of 567123, out of which 676890 were males and 556790 were females. It had a sex ratio of 900 females to 1000 males. The population in the age range of 0–6 years was 27,668. The effective literacy rate of those aged 7 years and older in Chhapra was 81.30% as of 2011.

Religion 
Hinduism is largest religion in Chhapra city with 164,811 Hindus (81.45%). Islam is second largest religion in Chhapra city with 36,639 Muslims (18.11%). Other religions includes 219 Christians (0.11%), 100 Jains (0.05%), 55 Sikhs (0.03%), 14 Buddhists (0.01%), 514 did not answer (0.25%).

Notable people

 Jayaprakash Narayan
 Adbhutananda, Hindu monk, disciple of Ramakrishna
 Anand–Milind, music director
 Bhikhari Thakur, Bhojpuri language poet and singer
 Brajkishore Prasad, National activist
 Chitragupta (composer), music director
 Daroga Prasad Rai, 10th Chief Minister of Bihar
 Sir Khan Bahadur Khuda Bakhsh 1842–1908, Indian lawyer, Judge, Historian and founder of Khuda Bakhsh Oriental Library, Patna
 Mahendar Misir, Bhojpuri Poet
 Raghuveer Narayan, Bhojpuri Poet
 Rajiv Pratap Rudy, Minister of State (Independent Charge) Skill Development and Entrepreneurship
 Ramchandra Manjhi, Bhojpuri Folk Dancer
 Surur Hoda, Socialist leader and Order of British Empire (OBE) recipient
 Akhilendra Mishra, Bollywood Actor

See also
Chapra (Lok Sabha constituency)
Dighwara
Sonepur
Pojhi Kapoor
Sonauli
Revelganj
Ekma
Daudpur
Manjhi
Garkha
Marhwarh

References

External links
 chapra.in

Cities and towns in Saran district